Penydarren BGC is a football club based in Penydarren, Merthyr Tydfil, who play in the Ardal Leagues South West, the third tier of the Welsh football pyramid.

History
During the 2018-19 season they gained promotion to the Welsh Football League Division One. They are best known for their run in the 2017–18 Welsh Cup by making the quarter final where they faced Bangor City

Current squad

JD Welsh Cup Run - 2017–18

Honours 

South Wales Amateur League Champions - 2017–18
Welsh Football League Division Three Champions - 2018–19
Welsh Football League Cup Champions - 2018–19

References

Football clubs in Wales
1985 establishments in Wales
Association football clubs established in 1985
Sport in Merthyr Tydfil County Borough
Welsh Football League clubs
South Wales Alliance League clubs
South Wales Senior League clubs
Ardal Leagues clubs